Ayonfe Sunday Akinbule, known as Sunday Akinbule (born 27 October 1996) is a Nigerian football player who plays for Mosta on loan from Spartaks Jūrmala.

Club career
He made his professional debut in the Segunda Liga for Farense on 7 February 2016 in a game against Mafra.

References

External links

1996 births
Living people
Nigerian footballers
Association football forwards
Gateway United F.C. players
S.C. Farense players
Sertanense F.C. players
F.C. Felgueiras players
Hapoel Ra'anana A.F.C. players
Al-Washm Club players
FC Shakhtyor Soligorsk players
FK Spartaks Jūrmala players
Mosta F.C. players
Nigerian expatriate footballers
Expatriate footballers in Portugal
Expatriate footballers in Israel
Expatriate footballers in Saudi Arabia
Expatriate footballers in Belarus
Expatriate footballers in Malta
Expatriate footballers in Latvia
Nigerian expatriate sportspeople in Portugal
Nigerian expatriate sportspeople in Israel
Nigerian expatriate sportspeople in Saudi Arabia
Nigerian expatriate sportspeople in Latvia
Nigerian expatriate sportspeople in Belarus
Liga Portugal 2 players
Israeli Premier League players
Saudi Second Division players